Rogue Valley Transportation District is a transportation district serving the greater Jackson County, Oregon area.  The district serves the cities of Medford, Ashland, White City, Phoenix, Talent, Jacksonville, and Central Point. The district also provides paratransit services to older adults and people with disabilities within its route coverage area.

The Rogue Valley Transportation District (RVTD) was established May 6, 1975 upon the passing of a special election measure allowing the county to establish a transportation district funded by Oregon tax dollars. Two years later after considerable planning and procurement of funding, the first transit buses took the streets of Medford, with service beginning in July 1977.

History
The need for creating RVTD arose when its predecessor, a private company named Mount Ashland Stage Lines, went bankrupt and ceased operating in 1974 after having served the Rogue Valley since 1965.  Area voters approved the creation of a new public transit district in 1975, but funding for operations was not included, and subsequent requests for authorization of a property-tax increase to fund the service were rejected at the ballot box. The district's board scaled back the original plans by about 35 percent before finally gaining voter approval of operations funding.  The service that was inaugurated in July 1977, initially operating under the name, Rogue Rapids Transit, comprised just three buses serving six routes. Initial ridership on the fledgling system was better than expected, prompting the city of Medford to agree to purchase three vans for RVTD's use, which were used for a new shuttle service in the downtown area starting in November 1977. The district's bus fleet has since grown to 20 vehicles.

Service Information 
RVTD currently operates 13 bus routes through the cities of Medford, Ashland, Central Point, Jacksonville, Phoenix, Talent and White City with aspirations to add more in the coming future. All buses run Monday through Saturday. RVTD provides no service on Sundays or Holidays. Most bus routes begin and terminate at the Front Street Transfer Center located at Front Street between 8th and 10th Street in Downtown Medford. The Greyhound Station is also located here.

Bus Routes (list incomplete)
Route 2 West Medford - Serves the West Medford area including Oakdale, Columbus, and Stewart avenues as well as a small stretch of Jacksonville Highway. Major businesses and locations served by this route include Bi-Mart, Black Bird, Medford City Hall, the City of Medford Police Station, the Jackson County Courthouse, Sherm's Thunderbird, and Albertson's Shopping Center. Weekdays, the first bus leaves Front Street Station at 6:00 AM with service once every thirty minutes until 8:00pm. On Saturday, the first bus leaves Front Street Station at 7:00am with service every hour until 6:00pm.
Route 10 Ashland - Serves the cities of Medford, Phoenix, Talent, and Ashland including but not limited to the South Gateway Shopping Center, the Harry and David Country Village, Bear Creek Operations Inc. (aka. Harry and David Operations Inc.), Ray's Food Place, the Ashland Plaza / Lithia Park, Southern Oregon University, as well as countless other businesses throughout the four cities. Weekdays, the first bus leaves Front Street Station at 5:00 AM with the last bus leaving at 8:00 PM. Buses depart every 30 minutes before 7:00am and after 5:00pm. Between 7:00am and 5:00pm buses depart every 20 minutes. On Saturday, the first bus leaves Front Street Station at 7:00am with service every hour until 6:00pm. 
Route 24 Rogue Valley Medical Center (formerly known as Route 4) - Serves Barnett road and S. Central/Riverside in Medford, including WinCo Foods, the Rogue Valley Medical Center (RVMC), as well as several businesses, medical offices, and residences surrounding the southeast Medford area. Weekdays, the first bus leaves Front Street Station at 6:00 AM, the last bus leaving at 8:00PM with service every 30 minutes. On Saturday, the first bus leaves Front Street Station at 7:30am with service every hour until 5:30pm. 
Route 25 SW Medford - Serves Jackson County Offices and South Medford High School. Weekdays, the first bus leaves Front Street Station at 6:00am with hourly service until the last bus leaving at 8:00pm. On Saturday, the first bus leaves Front Street Station at 7:00am with hourly service until the last bus leaving at 6:00pm.
Route 30 Jacksonville - Serves the city of Jacksonville and the west Medford Area via W. Jackson St. This includes Columbus Ave, Jacksonville Hwy, and downtown Jacksonville. The first bus leaves Front Street Station at 6:30AM with the last bus leaving at 7:30PM with service every hour. On Saturday, the first bus leaves Front Street Station at 7:30am with service every hour until the last bus leaving at 5:30pm.
Route 40 Central Point - Serves the cities of Medford and Central Point including Riverside and Central Avenues, the Rogue Valley Mall, Table Rock, Merriman, Bursell, and Hopkins Roads, downtown Central Point, and Crater High School. Weekdays, the first bus leaves Front Street Station at 6:00 AM with the last bus leaving at 8:00PM with service once every thirty minutes. On Saturday, the first bus leaves Front Street Station at 7:00am with service every hour until 6:00pm.
Route 60 White City - Serves the cities of Medford and White City via Crater Lake Ave and Crater Lake Hwy (Rt 62). It serves Providence Medical Center, Wal-Mart, Costco, North Medford (via Delta Waters Rd), as well as the Veteran's Affairs Domiciliary / Veteran's Hospital. Weekdays, the first bus leaves Front Street Station at 5:00 AM with the last bus leaving at 8:00 PM with service once every thirty minutes. On Saturday, the first bus leaves Front Street Station at 7:30am with service every hour until 5:30pm.
Route 61 Table Rock Road - Serves Biddle Rd. and Poplar Square shopping areas, the Airport, Table Rock Rd., the Rogue Community College (RCC) Table Rock Campus and the Cascade Shopping Center. Service on Route 61 is from 6:00 a.m. to 8:00 p.m. leaving hourly from Front Street Station, Monday through Friday and 7:00 a.m. to 6:00 p.m. Saturdays.

Connecting Services
Greyhound Lines - Offers several intercity departures daily along Interstate 5, connecting direct to Portland in the north and south to Sacramento, serving many intermediate cities along the way. Greyhound is serviced by all RVTD lines at Front Street station.
Southwest P.O.I.N.T. - This intercity route serves between Brookings and Klamath Falls with one departure each direction daily. POINT also serves several intermediate cities and popular destinations along the route, including Grants Pass and the Klamath Falls Amtrak station and the Coast Starlight. The Southwest P.O.I.N.T. is served by all RVTD lines at Front Street station.

Valley Lift Paratransit
The Rogue Valley Transportation District operates paratransit service known as Valley Lift. It is offered to senior citizens, people of physical or mental disability, or people who are unable to utilize fixed route buses for other reasons. Service is limited to areas which are no more than 3/4 of a mile by air from any fixed bus route. Such can be seen in their system map. People wishing to utilize the service must apply with RVTD after establishing their eligibility for Valley Lift.

Fares 
There are various methods to pay fares on RVTD buses. The most popular is cash; however, prepaid options are available. These options include tokens, day passes, monthly passes, as well as punch cards for 20 rides each. Passes, tokens, and punch cards can be purchased at any three of these locations:
 Front St. Station at 200 S. Front St. in Medford
 RVTD Administration Offices located at 3200 Crater Lake Ave. in Medford
 City of Ashland Utilities Office at 20 E. Main St.

Cash Fares

1. Some individuals may be required to furnish proof of age or a valid Valley Lift ID.

2. Transfers may be used any number of times within the 90-minute timeframe. People holding transfers which have been modified or mutilated in any way may be required to pay a second fare.

Passes and Tokens

1. Usage of one boarding with the noted methods entitles the user to a free 90-minute bus transfer, valid on all buses.

2. Only valid for the groups mentioned, two passes cannot be combined. Some individuals may be required to furnish proof of age or a valid Valley Lift or Reduced Fare ID.

Valley Lift Paratransit

Bus Fleet

Rogue Valley Transportation District operates a fleet of 23 buses, 23 paratransit buses. Roughly 85% of the current transit bus fleet is powered by cleaner-burning compressed natural gas (abbreviated CNG) engines. RVTD was one of the first transportation districts in the state of Oregon to operate a majority CNG fleet, originally acquiring their first prototype buses, the Blue Bird Q-Bus from Blue Bird Corporation, in 1995. 

Today RVTD has phased out the Blue Bird CNG vehicles in favor of the 35 foot natural gas coach manufactured by Gillig and New Flyer Industries. These newer buses provide for greater fuel capacity of 3600 psi compared to their predecessors 3000 psi limit (allowing greater range on one fill-up), provide space for more passengers (65 seated and standees compared to 50 seated and standees), a low floor design with fully automated wheelchair ramp (compared to the partially automated wheelchair lift), easier passenger boarding and deboarding, as well as a more powerful engine.

In addition to their natural gas buses, the Rogue Valley Transportation District also operates diesel transit coaches in efforts to diversify their fuel usage. This has several key advantages including switching over to primarily diesel usage in the event of a natural gas price hike or vice versa. RVTD runs the diesel New Flyer Low Floor and Low Floor Restyled coach and the Gillig Low Floor exclusively, however that may change as future fleet acquisitions occur. Previously in district history the entire fleet consisted of the New Look with a blue, yellow, and white paint scheme but the coaches have since been phased out.

Passenger Amenities

All RVTD buses feature the standard amenities one can come to expect from any transit agency. For example, all buses are equipped with front bike racks manufactured by SportsWorks, allowing up to two bicycles to be carried with their corresponding riders ). Each bus is equipped with both forward cabin and rear cabin heating units keeping each bus at a warm, comfortable temperature during the winter. Most of the buses also have air conditioning as well, save for the 4500 series (the GMC New Looks) which do not have A/C. All buses have padded frontal seats for additional comfort, with the 4500 series featuring both front and rear padded seats.

In compliance with the Americans with Disabilities Act of 1990 all RVTD buses feature some form of wheelchair ramp or lift as well as securement methods for the chairs themselves. The design in all buses allows a maximum of two wheelchairs to be secured safely in the bus at any given time. The majority of the fleet has automated time point stop announcement system on the buses; otherwise stops are called out by the operator. Real time schedule information is also available through Google maps. RVTD is currently working on a smart phone app to make the real-time information easier to access.

Transportation Demand Management Program

RVTD's planning department includes a transportation demand management (TDM) program. Primarily funded by Region 3 of the Oregon Department of Transportation, the TDM program uses various techniques to promote alternatives to driving alone. Among these techniques are a group bus pass program, bicycle and pedestrian encouragement and education activities, carpool matching, transit marketing, and outreach to local government jurisdictions.

References

External links 
RVTD Official Website
RVTD Ten-Year Long-Range Plan
New Flyer Industries
Clean Cities Article - Oregon Department of Energy
Medford Mail Tribune

See also 
Lane Transit District
TriMet (Tri-County Metropolitan Transportation District)
Cherriots (Salem-Keizer Transit)
 List of bus operating companies

Government agencies established in 1975
Bus transportation in Oregon
Jacksonville, Oregon
Transportation in Jackson County, Oregon
Central Point, Oregon
Transit agencies in Oregon
1975 establishments in Oregon
Transportation in Medford, Oregon